Akash Sherman is a Canadian film director.

Sherman was born and raised in Edmonton, Alberta, where his parents were a doctor and a pharmacist. He left Alberta to study filmmaking at Ryerson University, in Toronto, in 2015.

Sherman was studying film at Ryerson University when he began working on the script for his first feature film, Clara.  In 2015 he dropped out, after his first year, after he sold his script, to continue working on that film.  On September 10, 2018, CBC News quoted him at the film's premiere at the 2018 Toronto International Film Festival saying the premiere "felt like graduation".

Sherman and his family flew to India for the film's showing at the Mumbai Film Festival in October 2018.

In its review of Clara, Scientific American noted Sherman's dedication to scientific accuracy.  They quoted Sherman describe an insight he had, in art history class, that famous artists of the past were out creating art, when they were his age, not studying art.

When Seth Needle of Screen Media Films acquired the US streaming rights for Clara, he called Sherman "one of the best young filmmakers to watch today".

References

External links

1995 births
Living people
Film directors from Edmonton
Toronto Metropolitan University alumni
Canadian people of Indian descent